"Lights Out" is a song by American singer-songwriter Lisa Marie Presley. Capitol Records released the song as the lead single from her debut album, To Whom It May Concern (2003). Presley originally did not want to release this song as her debut single nor record it, but she relented as she believed it would help "clear the air". She co-wrote the song with Glen Ballard and Clif Magness, and it was produced by Andrew Slater. "Lights Out" is a country rock song that reflects on Presley's background as Elvis Presley's daughter, mentioning Graceland's back lawn and the graves of her relatives.

In the United States, "Lights Out" was released on February 10, 2003, and it was issued in several other countries over the following months. The song received positive reviews from music critics, with several reviewers comparing her vocals to those of Cher. Commercially, "Lights Out" peaked at number 14 on the US Billboard Bubbling Under Hot 100 chart and achieved top-40 placings on two other Billboard charts. Internationally, the single reached the top 30 in Australia, New Zealand, and the United Kingdom. A music video directed by Francis Lawrence was made to promote the single.

Background and release
Speaking of the song, Lisa Marie Presley said that she initially never wanted to make a song that mentioned her heritage, but "Lights Out" takes on a darker tone that Presley wanted to establish, as she did not want the lyrics to reflect on her background in a positive light. Presley wrote the song alongside Glen Ballard and Clif Magness. In the United States, the song was originally scheduled for a radio release on January 27, 2003, but it was delayed to February 10, 2003. Presley stated that she did not want Capitol Records to release "Lights Out" as her debut single since it talked about her family, including her father, Elvis Presley. She explained, "My concern was that it would go against everything I'm trying to do now, which is make my own thumbprint. By the end, though, I saw that it might help clear the air". In Australia, the song was released as a CD single on April 7, 2003, and on June 30, 2003, a CD and DVD single were issued in the United Kingdom.

Composition
"Lights Out" is a country rock and pop song. New York Times critic Anthony DeCurtis has described it as an "easy-rolling, roots-oriented guitar groove". Its lyrics talk about the graves of Presley's family at Graceland, referring to the "damn back lawn" of the estate. Set in common time, the song is written in the key of D major and possesses a moderate tempo of 112 beats per minute.

Critical reception
"Lights Out" was positively received by music critics. Chuck Taylor of Billboard magazine called the song's country-rock sound a "perfect" emulation of Elvis Presley while another Billboard reviewer, Ray Waddell, labeled it a "real powerhouse". Nigel Patterson of the Elvis Information Network wrote that "Lights Out" was a good debut for Presley and also commended B-side "Savior" for complementing "Lights Out" appealingly. He went on to note the song's "infectious" beat and "searing" lyrics and said that the song was good choice for radio airplay, citing its multi-generational appeal. ElvisNews.com compared Presley's vocals on the song to those of Shania Twain, Wynonna Judd, and especially Cher, recalling her version of Marc Cohn's "Walking in Memphis". Entertainment Weekly gave the song a "B+" rating, also noting the resemblance to Cher and further comparing Presley's voice to that of Sheryl Crow's. Taylor described her voice as a cross between Cher and Patty Smyth.

Chart performance
"Lights Out" did not make it onto the US Billboard Hot 100 chart, stalling at number 14 on the Billboard Bubbling Under Hot 100 on May 18, 2003, and staying on the listing for five issues. It fared well on other Billboard charts, peaking at number 18 on the Adult Top 40 and number 34 on the Mainstream Top 40 during May 2003. In Canada, it was released as a CD single, allowing it to chart on the Canadian Singles Chart and peak at number 12 on April 26, 2003. In Europe, the song managed to chart in the United Kingdom, where it debuted and peaked at number 16 on the UK Singles Chart on July 6, 2003. On the Eurochart Hot 100, it appeared at number 61 on July 19, 2003. The song also charted in Australia and New Zealand. In the former country, it debuted at its peak of number 29 on April 20, 2003, and spent two more nonconsecutive weeks within the top 50. In New Zealand, it peaked one place higher at number 28 and remained on the chart for 10 weeks throughout April, May, and June 2003.

Track listings
International CD single
 "Lights Out" – 3:44
 "Savior" – 3:19

UK and European DVD single
 "Lights Out" (video)
 About "Lights Out"
 "Savior"

Personnel
Personnel are taken from the international CD single liner notes.
 Lisa Marie Presley – writing, vocals
 Glen Ballard – writing
 Clif Magness – writing
 Andrew Slater – production, executive production
 Howard Willing – recording, additional recording and editing
 Eric Rosse – additional recording and editing
 Tom Lord-Alge – mixing

Charts

Release history

References

2003 debut singles
2003 songs
Capitol Records singles
Country rock songs
Lisa Marie Presley songs
Music videos directed by Francis Lawrence
Songs about Memphis, Tennessee
Songs about Elvis Presley
Songs written by Clif Magness
Songs written by Glen Ballard